Larry or Lawrence Gilbert may refer to:
Larry Gilbert (1942–1998), American professional golfer
Larry Gilbert (baseball), (1891–1965), American baseball outfielder
Larry Gilbert, see List of people executed in South Carolina for 1998
Lawrence Gilbert, character played by Josh Hamilton (actor)
 (born 1942), American botanist and entomologist
Larry Gilbertz (1929–2011), American politician